Lewis Hamilton is a British racing driver who has won seven Formula One World Championships. He made his Formula One debut with the McLaren team in 2007, achieving his first career victory in that year's  from his maiden pole position in only his sixth Grand Prix start. Hamilton achieved three more victories that season, making him the second rookie after Jacques Villeneuve to be World Drivers' Championship runner-up, and equalled Villeneuve's record of most Grand Prix wins in his maiden campaign. The following year, he won five , becoming, at 23 years and 300 days, the youngest driver to win the World Drivers' Championship at the time following a last-lap overtake on Timo Glock at the final round of the season, the wet-weather affected .

Hamilton won a further 10 events in  but he missed out on winning the championship to Rosberg, breaking the record for the most victories in a single season without winning the World Championship. The  season was the first in his career in which he did not win a race.

All of Hamilton's 103 victories came in a car powered by a Mercedes engine. He has achieved 21 victories racing for McLaren and the remaining 82 have come driving for Mercedes. Hamilton has been most successful at the Hungaroring and the Silverstone Circuit, where he has won eight times each, jointly holding the record with Schumacher for the highest number of victories at the same race track and the same Grand Prix, the British and Hungarian Grands Prix. He also maintains the records for winning at the highest number of different  and different race circuits at 31 each, and shares the record of the highest number of consecutive seasons with at least one victory with Schumacher at 15 years in succession.

Wins

Key:
 No. – Victory number; for example, "1" signifies Hamilton's first race win.
 Race – Race number in Hamilton's Formula One career; for example "15" signifies Hamilton's 15th Formula One race.
 Grid – The position on the grid from which Hamilton started the race
 Margin – Margin of victory, given in the format of minutes:seconds.milliseconds
  – Driver's Championship winning season.

Number of wins at different Grands Prix

Hamilton has won at a record 31 out of 38 different Grands Prix in which he has competed. The 70th Anniversary Grand Prix, the Dutch Grand Prix, the European Grand Prix, the Indian Grand Prix, the Korean Grand Prix, the Mexico City Grand Prix and the Miami Grand Prix are the seven races he has entered and not won.

Number of wins at different circuits
Hamilton has won at a record 31 out of 37 different circuits at which he has driven. The Buddh International Circuit, the Circuit de Nevers Magny-Cours, Circuit Zandvoort, the Korea International Circuit, the Miami International Autodrome and the Valencia Street Circuit are the six race tracks where Hamilton has driven and not achieved a Grand Prix victory.

See also
 List of Formula One Grand Prix winners

Notes

References

Bibliography

External links 
 Drivers: Hall of Fame: Lewis Hamilton
 Lewis Hamilton: Involvement from Stats F1

Hamilton, Lewis
Formula One Grand Prix wins
2000s in motorsport
2000s-related lists
2010s in motorsport
2010s-related lists
2020s in motorsport
2020s-related lists